The following is the list of squads for each of the 12 teams competing in the EuroBasket 1985, held in West Germany between 5 and 16 June 1985. Each team selected a squad of 12 players for the tournament.

Group A

France

Poland

Romania

Spain

Soviet Union

Yugoslavia

Group B

Bulgaria

Czechoslovakia

Israel

Italy

Netherlands

West Germany

References
 1985 European Championship for Men, FIBA.com.
 European Championship 1985 - National Squads, LinguaSport.com.

1985